This is a list of notable people who have narcolepsy.

Jinkx Monsoon (Jerick Roman Lamar Hoffer) American Drag Performer

List

 Gabe Barham, drummer for American post-hardcore band Sleeping With Sirens
Franck Bouyer, French road racing cyclist
 Lenny Bruce, American stand-up comedian, social critic, and satirist
Molly Burhans, Environmentalist and cartographer
Kevin Cadogan, musician (Third Eye Blind)
 George M. Church, molecular geneticist
Sir Winston Churchill, British statesman, army officer, writer and Prime Minister of United Kingdom
Graeme Dott, Scottish snooker player, 2006 World Champion
Aaron Flahavan, Portsmouth F.C Goalkeeper who died in 2001
G.O, K-pop idol (member of K-pop boygroup MBLAQ)
Paul Gonsalves, jazz musician
Teresa Nielsen Hayden, science fiction editor and essayist
Harold M. Ickes, deputy White House chief of staff to Bill Clinton
Jimmy Kimmel, late night talk show host
Nastassja Kinski, actress
Arthur Lowe, actor
Harriet Tubman, American abolitionist and political activist
Kang Daniel, K-pop idol (member of K-pop boygroup Wanna One) 
Dawn (rapper), South-Korean rapper and former K-pop idol

References

Narcolepsy